The Google Fast Pair Service, or simply Fast Pair, is Google's proprietary standard for quickly pairing Bluetooth devices when they come in close proximity for the first time using Bluetooth Low Energy (BLE). It was announced in October 2017 and initially designed for connecting audio devices such as speakers, headphones and car kits with the Android operating system. In 2018, Google added support for ChromeOS devices, and in 2019, Google announced that Fast Pair connections could now be synced with other Android devices with the same Google Account. Google has partnered with Bluetooth SoC designers including Qualcomm, Airoha Technology, and BES Technic to add Fast Pair support to their SDKs. In May 2019, Qualcomm announced their Smart Headset Reference Design, Qualcomm QCC5100, QCC3024 and QCC3034 SoC series with support for Fast Pair and Google Assistant. In July 2019, Google announced True Wireless Features (TWF), Find My Device and enhanced Connected Device Details.

List of supported devices

Earbuds 
 Google Pixel Buds (First generation)
 Google Pixel Buds A-Series
 Google Pixel Buds (Second generation)
 Google Pixel Buds Pro
 Cleer Ally Plus
 OnePlus Buds
 OnePlus Buds Z
 Realme Buds Air
 Realme Buds Air 2
 Realme Buds Air 3
 Realme Buds Air Neo
 Realme Buds Air Pro
 Realme Buds Q2
 Realme Buds Q2S
Dizo Wireless Dash Neckband
Dizo Go pods D
 Microsoft Surface Earbuds
 JBL Live Free NC+ TWS
 JBL Live Tune 225 TWS
 JBL Reflect Mini NC TWS
 JBL Peak II
 JBL Tour Pro+
 JBL Club Pro+
 LG Tone Free (All devices)
 Beats Studio Buds
 Nothing ear (1) 
 Nothing ear (stick)
 Jaybird Vista 2
 Sony WF-C500
 Sony Linkbuds
 Sony Linkbuds S
 Jabra Elite 2
 Jabra Elite 3
 Jabra Elite 4 Active

In-Ear Monitors 
 Jaybird Tarah Wireless Sport Headphones
 Anker Spirit Pro GVA
 JBL Live 220BT
 1More Dual Driver BT ANC
 LG HBS-SL5/HBS-PL6S/HBS-SL6S/HBS-PL5
Sony WF-1000XM4
 Beyerdynamic Blue Byrd

Headphones 
 Cleer ENDURO 100
 Bang & Olufsen Beoplay H9 3rd Gen
 Bang & Olufsen Beoplay H4 2nd Gen
 Bose Noise Cancelling Headphones 700
 Bose QuietComfort 35 II
 Bose QuietComfort 45
 Libratone Q Adapt On-Ear
 Plantronics Voyager 8200
 AIAIAI TMA-2
JBL Live 400BT/500BT/650BT
Sony WH-1000XM4
Sony WH-1000XM5
Jabra Evolve2 75

Portable Speakers 
 Sony SRS-XB13
 Bang&Olufsen Beosound Explore
 Bang&Olufsen Beosound A1 2nd gen

Bluetooth SoCs (system-on-a-chip) 
 Qualcomm
CSR8670/CSR8675
QCC3024
QCC3034
QCC3071
QCC5100 series
 Airoha/Mediatek
AB1531
AB1532
AB1533
AB1536/AB1536U/AB1536S
AB1552/AB1552A
AB1555/AB1555A
AB1556
AB1558
 BES
BES2000IZ
BES2300IH/BES2300IZ/BES2300Y/BES2300Z/BES2300ZP
BES2500Y
 Microchip IS2083B BT 5.0 dual mode
 Realtek RTL8763BFP
 Audiowise PAU16xx/PAU18xx/PAU19xx
 Zgmicro 9638
 Cypress CYW20721B2

References 

Google
Bluetooth
Telecommunications standards